The Roland Hartley House is a historic house located at 2320 Rucker Avenue in Everett, Washington.

Description and history
Built in 1910 the house reflects the Classical Revival architectural style. It was the home of Washington Governor Roland H. Hartley.  It was listed on the National Register of Historic Places on May 2, 1986.

Photo gallery

See also
 National Register of Historic Places listings in Snohomish County, Washington

References

External links 

 

1910 establishments in Washington (state)
Houses completed in 1910
Houses in Snohomish County, Washington
Houses on the National Register of Historic Places in Washington (state)
National Register of Historic Places in Everett, Washington
Neoclassical architecture in Washington (state)